The 2001–02 Euroleague was the second season of the professional basketball competition for elite clubs throughout Europe, organised by Euroleague Basketball Company, and it was the 45th season of the premier competition for European men's clubs overall. The season started on October 10, 2001, and ended on May 5, 2002.

The Final Four was hosted in the PalaMalaguti in Bologna, Italy. A number of 32 teams competed for the championship, which was won by Panathinaikos. Mirsad Türkcan was named Regular season MVP, while Dejan Bodiroga was awarded EuroLeague Top 16 MVP and EuroLeague Final Four MVP.

Competition system 

 41 teams in total with the qualification rounds, and 32 teams at the first group stage (the national domestic league champions from the best leagues, and a variable number of other clubs from the most important national domestic leagues), playing in a tournament system. The competition culminated in a Final Four.

Team allocation

Distribution 
The table below shows the default access list.

Teams 
The labels in the parentheses show how each team qualified for the place of its starting round (TH: EuroLeague title holders)

 1st, 2nd, etc.: League position after Playoffs
 WC: Wild card

Qualifying rounds

First qualifying round 

|}

Second qualifying round 

|}

Third qualifying round 

|}

Regular season 
The first phase was a regular season, in which the competing teams were drawn into four groups, each containing eight teams. Each team played every other team in its group at home and away, resulting in 14 games for each team in the first stage. The top 4 teams in each group advanced to the next round, The Top 16. The complete list of tiebreakers is provided in the lead-in to the Regular Season results.

If one or more clubs were level on won-lost record, tiebreakers were applied in the following order:
 Head-to-head record in matches between the tied clubs
 Overall point difference in games between the tied clubs
 Overall point difference in all group matches (first tiebreaker if tied clubs were not in the same group)
 Points scored in all group matches
 Sum of quotients of points scored and points allowed in each group match

Group A

Group B

Group C

Group D

Top 16 
The remaining 16 teams were placed into four groups of four teams each. Each team played every other team in its group twice, once at home and once away. The top teams of each of the four groups advanced to the Final Four.

Group E

Group F

Group G

Group H

Final Four

Awards

Top Scorer

Regular Season MVP

Top 16 MVP

Final Four MVP

Finals Top Scorer

All-Euroleague First Team

All-Euroleague Second Team

Round MVP

Regular season

Top 16

Individual statistics

Rating

Points

Rebounds

Assists

Other statistics

Individual game highs

See also 
 2001–02 FIBA Saporta Cup
 2001–02 FIBA Korać Cup

References

External links 
 Euroleague 2001/02 ULEB Euroleague 2001/02 
 Euroleague.net - Official Euroleague homepage.
 Eurobasket.com - Popular basketball news site.
 TalkBasket.net - Basketball forum.

 
EuroLeague seasons